Secundino Borabota Epacua (born 21 February 1961) is an Equatoguinean sprinter. He competed in the men's 100 metres at the 1988 Summer Olympics.

References

1961 births
Living people
Athletes (track and field) at the 1984 Summer Olympics
Athletes (track and field) at the 1988 Summer Olympics
Equatoguinean male sprinters
Olympic athletes of Equatorial Guinea
Place of birth missing (living people)